The Arabian gazelle (Gazella arabica) is a species of gazelle from the Arabian Peninsula. There are approximately 5,000 - 7,000 mature individuals in the wild.

Taxonomy
Until recently, it was only known from a single lectotype specimen mistakenly thought to have been collected on the Farasan Islands in the Red Sea in 1825. A 2013 genetic study of the lectotype specimen revealed that skull and skin do not stem from the same individual but belong to two distinct lineages of the mountain gazelle (Gazella gazella), necessitating restriction of the lectotype to the skin to conserve nomenclatural stability. A later study formalized the use of Gazella arabica for the Arabian lineage of the mountain gazelle, and synonymized Gazella erlangeri with G. arabica.

Ecology 
Arabian gazelles predominantly feed on acacia trees (Genus Vachellia). They share their habitat with many other herbivores, including Dorcas gazelles, Nubian ibex, Asiatic wild ass, and Arabian oryx.

Their main predators are Arabian wolves.

The Arabian gazelle lives in grassland, shrubland, and desert habitat types.

Conservation
The arabian gazelle is classified as Vulnerable by the International Union for the Conservation of Nature (IUCN). The population is declining: estimated at 12,000 mature individuals in 2008, the species now numbers approximately 5,000 to 7,000 as of 2016.

There are many environmental factors affecting the population density of Arabian gazelles, such as human hunting, predation, competition, and climate change. The decline in population is due to human disturbances such as construction, livestock competition, capture for the pet trade, and illegal hunting. Other factors include temperature change, and predation (mainly by wolves); as the researchers stated in their findings that, “Wolf encounter rate had a significant negative effect on G. arabica population size, while G. dorcas population size had a significant positive effect, suggesting that wolf predation shapes the population size of both gazelle species."

Status and Population by Country

Iran 
There is a small reintroduced population in Iran's Farur Island.

Israel 
A relict population of approximately 30 Arabian gazelles lives in Israel's Arava Valley. Known locally as "Acacia gazelles," they are protected in a fenced enclosure at the Yotvata Hai-Bar Nature Reserve. There is some evidence that they face browsing competition from the Dorcas gazelles that share their enclosure, which has prompted the removal of many.

Oman 
In the 1990s, Oman's population was approximately 13,000 individuals, the majority living in the Jiddat al-Harasis. However, the population has been in continuous decline since then due to poaching. They live in several nature reserves, including the Arabian Oryx Sanctuary, Wadi Sareen Tahr Reserve, Jebel Samhan Nature Reserve, and Al Saleel National Park.

Saudi Arabia 
Saudi Arabia has approximately 1,500 - 1,700 individuals, of which 1,000 live on the Farasan Islands, which are protected as a nature reserve. The Farasan Island gazelles are surveyed by the National Commission for Wildlife Conservation and Development every 2-3 years. They are protected in other nature reserves, including the Ibex Reserve and Uruq Bani Ma’arid.

United Arab Emirates 
The United Arab Emirates contains several small and scattered populations.

Yemen 
Arabian gazelles are present in Yemen, but there is no recent population estimate due to ongoing conflict.

See also
List of mammals of Saudi Arabia
Saudi gazelle

References

External links
 The Extinction Website - Species Info - Arabian Gazelle

Arabian gazelle
Antelopes of Asia
Mammals of the Arabian Peninsula
Arabian gazelle